Live at the Cardiff Capitol Theater is a live concert recording of Lynyrd Skynyrd during a European tour in support of their third album, Nuthin' Fancy. It was released by Geffen Records alongside Authorized Bootleg: Live In Winterland, San Francisco, CA, 3/07/76 which captures a concert four months later. This concert took place at the Capitol Theatre in Cardiff, Wales on November 4, 1975.

Track listing
"Double Trouble" – 3:02
"I Ain't the One" – 3:49
"The Needle And The Spoon" – 4:41
"Saturday Night Special" – 5:24
"Gimme Three Steps" – 5:27
"Same Old Blues Again" - 4:31
"Simple Man" - 6:14
"Whiskey Rock-A-Roller" – 3:57
"Call Me The Breeze" – 5:36
"T For Texas" - 8:11
"Sweet Home Alabama" – 5:28
"Free Bird" – 12:20

Personnel 
Lynyrd Skynyrd

Ronnie Van Zant – lead vocals
Allen Collins – guitars
Gary Rossington – guitars
Billy Powell – keyboards
Leon Wilkeson – bass, background vocals
Artimus Pyle – drums, percussion

Lynyrd Skynyrd live albums
1975 live albums
Geffen Records live albums